West Hertfordshire was a parliamentary constituency in Hertfordshire.  It returned one Member of Parliament (MP)  to the House of Commons of the Parliament of the United Kingdom by the first past the post system. The constituency was abolished for the 1997 general election.

History
The constituency was created for the 1983 general election from the majority of the abolished County Constituency of Hemel Hempstead. It was abolished for the 1997 general election, with Tring being transferred to South West Hertfordshire and the remaining areas forming the re-established constituency of Hemel Hempstead.

It was held by the Conservatives for the entire period of its existence.

Boundaries
The District of Dacorum wards of Adeyfield East, Adeyfield West, Aldbury and Wigginton, Ashridge, Bennetts End, Berkhamsted, Boxmoor, Central, Chaulden, Crabtree, Cupid Green, Flamstead and Markyate, Gadebridge, Grove Hill, Highfield, Leverstock Green, Nash Mills, South, Tring Central, Tring East, Tring West, and Warners End.

The main settlements in the constituency were Hemel Hempstead, Berkhamsted and Tring.

Members of Parliament

Election results

Elections in the 1980s

Elections in the 1990s

See also
Parliamentary constituencies in Hertfordshire

Notes and references

Parliamentary constituencies in Hertfordshire (historic)
Constituencies of the Parliament of the United Kingdom established in 1983
Constituencies of the Parliament of the United Kingdom disestablished in 1997